Reingardslivatnet is a lake in the municipality of Rana in Nordland county, Norway. It flows out into the river Røvassåga to the east.

See also
 List of lakes in Norway
 Geography of Norway

References

Rana, Norway
Lakes of Nordland